The Mongolian Hockey League (Mongolian: Монгол хоккейн лигийн) is the national ice hockey league in Mongolia. It was first contested in 1992.

Participating teams
 Baganuur
 Bilegtkhuu Ulaanbaatar
 Burkhant Bars
 Capital Bank Ulaanbaatar
 Continental
 Darkhan
 Eermel Ulaanbaatar (not active)
 Erdenet
 EU Ulaanbaatar (not active)
 Jalam Khar
 Khangarid Erdenet
 MCS
 Otgon Od Blast Ulaanbaatar
 Shariin Gol
 Xac Bank
 Xasiin Xulguud
 Zaluus San Ulaanbaatar
 ZandT
 Zolboot Tamirchid

Past champions

 2018-19 : Shariin Gol
 2017-18 : Otgon Od Blast Ulaanbatar
 2016-17 : Baganuur
 2015-16 : Khangarid Erdenet
 2014-15 : Xasiin Xulguud
 2013-14 : Khangarid Erdenet
 2012–13 : Otgon Od Ulaanbataar
 2011–12 : Zaluus San Ulaanbaatar
 2010–11 : Baganuur
 2009–10 : Khangarid Erdenet
 2008–09 : Otgon Od Ulaanbataar
 2007–08 : Otgon Od Ulaanbaatar
 2006–07 : Otgon Od Ulaanbaatar
 2005–06 : Baganuur
 2004–05 : Baganuur
 2003–04 : Baganuur
 2002–03 : EU Ulaanbaatar
 2001–02 : EU Ulaanbaatar 
 2000–01 : EU Ulaanbaatar
 1999–00 : Baganuur
 1998–99 : Eermel Ulaanbaatar
 1997–98 : Eermel Ulaanbaatar
 1996–97 : Darkhan
 1995–96 : Shariin Gol
 1994–95 : Eermel Ulaanbaatar
 1993–94 : Eermel Ulaanbaatar
 1992–93 : Eermel Ulaanbaatar
 1991–92 : Eermel Ulaanbaatar

References

External links
League profile on eurohockey.com
League profile on hockeyarenas.net
List of champions  on hockeyarchives.info
List of champions on internationalhockey.net

Ice hockey leagues in Asia
Ice hockey in Mongolia